Lufkin Independent School District is a public school district based in Lufkin, Texas (USA). In addition to the city of Lufkin, Lufkin ISD serves a small portion of Burke.

In 2009, the school district was rated "academically acceptable" by the Texas Education Agency.

Schools
In the 2017-2018 school year, the district had students in 15 schools. (A 75 million dollar bond was passed May 5, 2018 to build a new middle school facility, and high school gym.)
High schools
Lufkin High School (Grades 9-12)
Middle schools
Lufkin Middle School (Grades 6-8)
Elementary schools
Anderson Elementary School (Grades 3-5)
Brandon Elementary School (Grades 3-5)
Brookhollow Elementary School (Grades 3-5)
Burley Elementary School (Grades KG-2)
Coston Elementary School (Grades 3-5)
Slack Elementary School (Grades 3-5)
Dunbar Primary School (Grades KG-2)
Garrett Primary School (Grades PK-KG)
Hackney Primary School (Grades PK)
Herty Primary School (Grades EE-2)
Kurth Primary School (Grades PK-2)
Trout Primary School (Grades EE-2)
Alternative schools
ACE Alternative School

School Board
There are 7 school board members. Texas state representative Trent Ashby is a former member and president of the board.
President, Scott Skelton
Vice President, Don Muhlbach
Secretary, Allyson Langston
Andra Self
Kristi Gay
Hall Henderson
Matt Knight

References

External links

School districts in Angelina County, Texas
Lufkin, Texas